Temperament Unsuited is a 1978 Australian short film directed by Ken Cameron and starring Steven J. Spears, Robyn Nevin, and Ruth Clayton. The film is about a school teacher.

References

External links
Temperament Unsuited at IMDb
Temperament Unsuited at Oz Movies

Australian drama short films
1970s English-language films
1978 films
1970s Australian films